Tavis Svend Hansen (born June 17, 1975) is a Canadian former professional ice hockey player.

Career
Hansen played two seasons (1993–1994 and 1994–1995) of junior hockey for the Tacoma Rockets of the Western Hockey League.

He was drafted in the 3rd round, 58th overall by the Winnipeg Jets in the 1994 NHL Entry Draft.  Hansen made his NHL debut with the Jets after his second and final season in Tacoma. His NHL rights were transferred to Phoenix Coyotes when the franchise relocated in 1996 and he made his first appearance as a 'Yote in the 1996–1997 season. Hansen was, however, quickly returned to Springfield before being called up again in 1998–1999. He scored his first NHL goal, versus Calgary, in February 1999, during what would be a 20-game stint with the Coyotes that season. He also made his first NHL playoff appearance in 1998.

In 1999–2000, Hansen was named captain of the Springfield Falcons and recorded career highs for points (48) and penalty minutes (164) while still managing to lend his skills to the Coyotes for five games. He returned in 2000–01 for seven games in Phoenix, playing 24 for the Falcons, alongside Danny Briere.

Hansen missed a majority of the 2000–2001 and 2001–2002 seasons recovering from a shoulder injury suffered in a game vs. the Hershey Bears (AHL) on February 3, 2001.  Ironically, Hershey later signed him as a free agent and he helped the Bears make a run at playoffs to finish off the 2001–2002 season.  He was signed as a free agent by San Jose Sharks on September 5, 2002, and played the next two seasons as captain for the Cleveland Barons (the Sharks' AHL affiliate).
 
During the 2004–2005 NHL lockout, Hansen made his first move overseas to play for Oji in the Asia League Ice Hockey.  He played the next two years for HC TWK Innsbruck (Erste Bank Eishockey Liga-Austria), and captained the Tirolean team his second season.

Tavis Hansen retired from professional hockey in April 2007.  He resides in Seattle, Washington with his family.

Career statistics

External links

Springfield Falcons "Where Are They Now?"

1975 births
Living people
Canadian ice hockey right wingers
Cleveland Barons (2001–2006) players
HC TWK Innsbruck players
Hershey Bears players
Oji Eagles players
Sportspeople from Prince Albert, Saskatchewan
Phoenix Coyotes players
Springfield Falcons players
Tacoma Rockets players
Winnipeg Jets (1979–1996) draft picks
Winnipeg Jets (1979–1996) players
Ice hockey people from Saskatchewan
Canadian expatriate ice hockey players in Austria
20th-century Canadian people
21st-century Canadian people